Michael L. Halligan (born July 9, 1949) is an American politician in the state of Montana. He served in the Montana State Senate from 1980 to 2001. From 1995 to 1997 he was minority leader of the Senate. An attorney, Halligan attended the University of Montana, where he earned his J.D. degree. He was deputy Missoula County Attorney from 1985 to 1990.

References

1949 births
Living people
People from Jamestown, North Dakota
Politicians from Billings, Montana
University of Montana alumni
Montana lawyers
Democratic Party Montana state senators